Ruggiero di Lauria may refer to:

Roger of Lauria (ca. 1245-1305), in Italian Ruggiero di Lauria or Ruggero di Lauria, an Italian admiral
Italian ironclad Ruggiero di Lauria, an ironclad battleship completed in 1888 and stricken in 1909
 Ruggiero di Lauria-class ironclad